Thomas Mowbray Charles-Edwards  (born 11 November 1943) is an emeritus academic at the University of Oxford. He formerly held the post of Jesus Professor of Celtic and is a Professorial Fellow at Jesus College.

Biography
He was educated at Ampleforth College before reading History at Corpus Christi College, Oxford, where he studied for a doctorate after taking the Diploma in Celtic Studies under Sir Idris Foster. He studied at the Dublin Institute for Advanced Studies from 1967 to 1969. He then was a junior research fellow and then a fellow in history at Corpus Christi College before being appointed to the chair of Celtic.

His expertise is in the fields of the history and language of Wales and Ireland, during the so-called Irish Dark Age (during the Roman Empire) and the general "Dark Ages", which followed the collapse of the Roman Empire in the west.

He is a Fellow of the Royal Historical Society, a Fellow of the British Academy and a Founding Fellow of the Learned Society of Wales. He was elected honorary member of the Royal Irish Academy in 2007.

He is a great-grandson of Thomas Charles Edwards, first Principal of Aberystwyth University.

Publications

References

External links
Personal website for Jesus College.
Electronic Bibliography of Irish Linguistics and Literature:
1942–71
1971–

Alumni of Corpus Christi College, Oxford
Fellows of Corpus Christi College, Oxford
Fellows of Jesus College, Oxford
Fellows of the British Academy
Fellows of the Royal Historical Society
Fellows of the Learned Society of Wales
Living people
1943 births
Celtic studies scholars
20th-century Welsh historians
Anglo-Saxon studies scholars
Jesus Professors of Celtic
People educated at Ampleforth College
Historians of the University of Oxford
21st-century Welsh historians